The Darjah Utama Bakti Cemerlang is a Singaporean national honour instituted in 1968. It was created to replace the Pingat Bakti Chemerlang and is awarded to any person who has performed within Singapore any act or series of acts which constitute distinguished conduct. It may be awarded to people performing acts of distinguished conduct outside Singapore under special circumstances.

The medal of the Darjah Utama Bakti Cemerlang is worn as a neck decoration pendant from a ribbon. Recipients are entitled to use the post-nominal letters DUBC.

The military equivalent of the award is the Darjah Utama Bakti Cemerlang (Tentera).

Recipients 
Source:

References

External links

1968 establishments in Singapore
Civil awards and decorations of Singapore